Philipus Freylinck (9 April 1886 – 15 December 1908) was a South African cyclist. He competed in four events at the 1908 Summer Olympics. Freylinck committed suicide by shooting himself in 1908.

References

External links
 

1886 births
1908 suicides
South African male cyclists
Olympic cyclists of South Africa
Cyclists at the 1908 Summer Olympics
People from Graaff-Reinet
Suicides by firearm in South Africa
Sportspeople from the Eastern Cape